Rebati Mohan Dutta Choudhury (1924–2008) was a noted Assamese litterateur, Sahitya Akademi Award winner and an academician from Gauripur in Assam, India. Popularly he is known as Sheelabhadra, his pen name.

Early life and education
Born in 1924 at Gauripur in Dhubri District, Dutta Choudhury pursued his graduation from Carmichael College, Rangpur (now in Bangladesh). He obtained his post-graduation in Pure Mathematics from Calcutta University in 1946, with a first class and silver medal.

Career
After his post-graduated studies, he joined Cotton College, Guwahati as a lecturer in Mathematics. Subsequently, he became a contractor, a sub-editor with the Assam Tribune and assistant manager in a tea estate for some time and finally he restarted his teaching career in the Assam Engineering College, Guwahati in 1957 as a lecturer. And he retired in 1982 as a professor in mathematics.

He died on 29 February 2008 at a hospital in Guwahati.

Literary works
Dutta Choudhury's major literary works are Madhupur aru Tarangini, Agomonir Ghat, Anahatguri, Abichinna, Prachir, Godhuli and Anusandhan (all novels) and Baastab, Beer Sainik, Samudrateer, Tarua Kadam, Pratiksha, Uttaran, Mezaz, Sheelabhadrar Kuria Galpa, Nirbachita Galpa, Madhupurar Madhukar, Anya ek Madhupur, Uttar Nai, Dayitya aru Anyanya Galpa, Biswas aru Anyanya Galpa, Lagaria and several other collections of short stories. Many of his literary works have been translated into Hindi, Bengali, Punjabi, Telugu and Oriya by the National Book Trust, the Sahitya Akademi and the Bharatiya Jnanpith. Smriticharan is his autobiography.

Novels

Short story collections

Autobiography

Awards and honours
Dutta Choudhury was honoured with the 1994 Sahitya Akademi Award in Assamese for his short stories collection, Madhupur Bahudur, the Assam Valley Literary Award in 2001, the Bharatiya Bhasa Parishad award in 1990 and the Assam Publication Board award in the same year.

References

External links

 Rebati Mohan Dutta Choudhury Profile

People from Dhubri district
1924 births
2008 deaths
Novelists from Assam
Recipients of the Sahitya Akademi Award in Assamese
Scholars from Assam
Indian newspaper editors
University of Calcutta alumni
Indian male novelists
Indian male short story writers
Recipients of the Assam Valley Literary Award
20th-century Indian novelists
20th-century Indian short story writers
Journalists from Assam
20th-century Indian male writers
Carmichael College alumni